The Andorra men's national 3x3 team is the 3x3 basketball team representing Andorra in international competitions, organized and run by the Andorran Basketball Federation.

Senior Competitions

Performance at World Championships

Performance at European Games

Performance at Europe Championships

Youth Competitions

Performance at the Youth Olympic Games

Performance at Under-18 World Championships

Performance at Under-18 European Championships

See also 
 Andorra women's national 3x3 team

References

External links 
Andorra Basketball Federation website

Basketball
Men's national 3x3 basketball teams
Basketball in Andorra